The Cannabis Administration and Opportunity Act (S.4591)  is a proposed bill in the United States Congress to recognize legalization of cannabis by the states. The authors are Senate Majority Leader Chuck Schumer, Senator Cory Booker, and Senator Ron Wyden.

History 
On March 31, 2021, following New York legalization under the 2021 Marijuana Regulation and Taxation Act, Senate Majority Leader Chuck Schumer announced he would soon introduce a federal bill to deschedule cannabis, similar to his 2018 Marijuana Freedom and Opportunity Act. Sources told Politico and other media that a draft of the bill would be introduced on July 14.

On July 14, 2021, Senator Schumer introduced a discussion draft of the bill.

On February 4, 2022, Schumer said the legislation would be introduced in the U.S. Senate in April of that year. Later in February, Schumer circulated a letter asking  other senators to "join the process of perfecting" the draft, and for their support. The bill was said to be likely to be introduced by its sponsors on or around the unofficial 420 cannabis holiday, i.e. April 20, 2022, but it was later postponed to "before August recess". 

The bill was introduced in the United States Senate on July 21, 2022. In addition to decriminalizing cannabis at the federal level, the bil would expunge federal cannabis-related criminal records. It would add new funding for law enforcement to go after illegal marijuana operations.

Reception and analysis
The bill was called by ABC News in 2021 "the first time in history [senators from a major party] introduced a bill to decriminalize marijuana at the federal level and remove cannabis from the federal list of controlled substances" and end federal prohibition.

The New York Times wrote that the bill was unlikely to become law, but was significant because "[t]he suggestion that the Senate's top leader and the chairman of the powerful Finance Committee would sponsor major decriminalization legislation would have been fantastical in the not-too-distant past".

The Associated Press wrote that the support of the Senate Majority Leader for ending prohibition "underscor[es] how a once-fringe idea is increasingly mainstream".

See also
List of 2021 United States cannabis reform proposals
List of 2022 United States cannabis reform proposals

Notes

References

Further reading

External links
Draft bill at The New York Times
Legislation to End Federal Prohibition of Marijuana (July 14, 2021) at C-Span

2021 cannabis law reform
Cannabis law in the United States
Proposed legislation of the 117th United States Congress
2022 cannabis law reform